Shaun King (born 1979) is an American writer and activist.

Shaun King may also refer to:

 Shaun King (American football) (born 1977), American football player
 Shaun King (basketball), player from South West Slammers

See also 
 Sean King (disambiguation)
 Shawn King (born 1972), American football player, Carolina Panthers and Indianapolis Colts
 Shawn King (basketball) (born 1982), Saint Vincent and the Grenadines basketball player